James H. Wallis (1861–1940) was a Latter-day Saint hymnwriter, editor and Patriarch.  He was the author of the hymn "Come, Ye Children of The Lord".

Wallis was born in April, 1861 in London, England. His parents were James Wallis and Jane Sarah Booth. Wallis joined the Church of Jesus Christ of Latter-day Saints (LDS Church) in 1877 and immigrated to the United States in 1881, settling in Utah Territory.

Wallis was involved in printing and publishing.  He was trained while working on the Millennial Star under William L. Davies.  In Vol. 95, no. 20 of the Star Wallis published an article on the history of the magazine entitled "The Star and Its Prophesied Headquarters".  At that point he was serving as the associate editor of the magazine.

In 1917, Wallis became the editor of the Vernal Express in Vernal, Utah. Wallis bought this paper in 1921. His son William B. Wallis, his grandson Jack R. Wallis and his great-grandson Steven R. Wallis continued running the paper until Steven's death in 2007.  Prior to coming to Vernal, Wallis had served as editor of the paper that by 1914 was entitled the Paris Post being published in Paris, Idaho.  In total Wallis was editor or publisher of 22 different papers at various locations in Utah and Idaho.

In 1927, Wallis became the bishop of the LDS Church's Vernal 1st Ward. While in this position he oversaw the construction of a chapel for the ward.  In 1931, Wallis was called as traveling patriarch for the British Mission, and was the first patriarch authorized to give patriarchal blessings in Britain since the 1840s, when Peter Melling and John Albertson had been serving as patriarchs. While in England, Wallis gave approximately 1300 patriarchal blessings.  He finished this assignment in 1933 and returned to the United States. He then served as patriarch of the Emigration Stake on the east side of Salt Lake City until his death in 1940.  In 1934 Wallis fulfilled a six-month assignment to go to the Canadian Mission, headquartered in Toronto, and give patriarchal blessings to the members living in that mission's boundaries. Members of The Church of Jesus Christ of Latter-day Saints there were glad to get these blessings.

Wallis wrote several poems, many of which were published in 1883.

Notes

References
 
General Conference Report, October 1935, p. 64
J. Spencer Cornwall. Stories of Our Mormon Hymns. (Salt Lake City: Deseret Book Company, 1975) p. 31
Richard L. Evans. A Century of Mormonism in Great Britain. (Salt Lake City: Publishers Press, 1937) p. 131.
General Conference Report, October 1934, p. 28.
History of Vernal Express mentioning Wallis' role in its history

Further reading
Gloria Wallis Rytting. James H. Wallis: Poet, Printer and Patriarch. (Salt Lake City: R&R Enterprises, 1989)

1861 births
1940 deaths
20th-century Mormon missionaries
Converts to Mormonism
English emigrants to the United States
English Latter Day Saints
English Mormon missionaries
English Latter Day Saint hymnwriters
English hymnwriters
Mormon missionaries in Canada
Mormon missionaries in the United Kingdom
Patriarchs (LDS Church)
English leaders of the Church of Jesus Christ of Latter-day Saints
Writers from London